Digpal Lanjekar is an Indian film director and writer who is known for the four installments of the Shivraj Ashtak: Farzand (2018), Fatteshikast (2019), Pawankhind (2022) and Sher Shivraj (2022).

Filmography

Films 
Digpal Lanjekar has directed 4 films so far.

References

External links 
 

Marathi film directors
Indian film directors
Living people
Year of birth missing (living people)